Melittia chalconota is a moth of the family Sesiidae. It is known from Ghana, Nigeria and Tanzania.

References

Sesiidae
Insects of the Democratic Republic of the Congo
Insects of West Africa
Insects of Tanzania
Moths of Africa
Moths described in 1910